Saúl Ñíguez Esclapez (born 21 November 1994), known as Saúl, is a Spanish professional footballer who plays as a central or defensive midfielder for La Liga club Atlético Madrid and the Spain national team.

After coming through Atlético Madrid's youth academy, Saúl went on to appear in more than 300 competitive matches for the club. In the 2013–14 season, he was on loan at Rayo Vallecano, also in La Liga.

Having represented Spain at various youth levels, Saúl helped the under-21 team finish second in the 2017 UEFA European Under-21 Championship, being top scorer in the process. He was selected by the senior team for the 2018 FIFA World Cup.

Club career

Atlético Madrid
Born in Elche, Valencian Community, Saúl moved to Real Madrid at the age of 11 before switching to cross-city rivals Atlético Madrid in 2008. He made his senior debut in the 2010–11 season, appearing for the reserve team in the Segunda División B. His first goal came on 10 April 2011 in a 3–1 away win against Extremadura, his only of the season in an eventual midtable finish.

In July 2011, Saúl joined the Atlético main squad for pre-season training. On 8 March 2012, at the age of just 17 years and 108 days, he made his debut with the Atlético first team, playing the last six minutes of a 3–1 home win against Beşiktaş in the UEFA Europa League. His second appearance came on 20 September, again as a substitute and in the Europa League, this time against Hapoel Tel Aviv. Three days later, he scored both goals for Atlético B in a 2–1 away derby win over Real Madrid C.

Saúl made his La Liga debut on 21 April 2013, playing two minutes in a 1–0 win away to Sevilla after replacing fellow youth graduate Koke. Again from the bench, he appeared in his second league match with the main squad on 4 May, against Deportivo La Coruña in a 0–0 draw.

On 21 July 2013, Saúl joined Rayo Vallecano on loan for the 2013–14 season. After returning, he featured in both legs of the 2014 Supercopa de España in which Atlético defeated Real Madrid, starting in the first match.

In a Madrid derby on 7 February 2015, Saúl replaced the injured Koke after ten minutes, and scored his team's second goal shortly after through a bicycle kick, in a 4–0 win. From the 2015–16 season onwards, after the departure of Mario Suárez and the injury of Tiago Mendes, Saúl became a nuclear midfield element for the Diego Simeone-led team.

On 27 April 2016, Saúl played 85 minutes in the first leg of the semi-finals of the UEFA Champions League against FC Bayern Munich, and also scored the only goal at the Vicente Calderón Stadium with an individual effort. Starting in the final against Real Madrid, he played the entire 120 minutes and successfully converted his attempt in the penalty shoot-out, in a 5–3 loss. The following 18 April, in the same competition but in the quarter-final, he scored through a header to help Atlético to a 1–1 draw away to Leicester City. Also in that month, in an interview given to Diario AS, he admitted to having played for "two seasons" under extremely painful circumstances.

On 1 July 2017, Saúl signed a new nine-year contract with Atlético. He made nine appearances in the 2017–18 Europa League, scoring three goals for the eventual champions.

Saúl started his 250th match for the club on 18 August 2019, in a win over Getafe. In the 2020 Supercopa de España Final against Real Madrid, which ended 0–0 after extra time, both he and Thomas Partey missed their shoot-out attempts in a 4–1 defeat.

On 18 February 2020, Saúl scored from close range in the fourth minute of the 2019–20 Champions League's round-of-16 first leg – his tenth goal in the competition– against defending champions Liverpool to ensure a 1–0 home win for the hosts. He also featured in the second leg at Anfield, playing the entire 3–2 extra-time victory.

On 30 June 2020, Saúl scored twice from penalties in a 2–2 draw away to Barcelona, as Atlético managed that number of goals against that opposition in a league match for the first time under Simeone.

Loan to Chelsea

On 31 August 2021, Saúl joined Premier League club Chelsea on loan for the remainder of the 2021–22 season, with an option to make the transfer permanent upon the completion of the loan. He made his Premier League debut on 11 September, in a 3–0 win against Aston Villa, but received criticism from fans for his performance. He won the Club World Cup with Chelsea on 12 February 2022, coming on as a 76th minute substitute to replace Callum Hudson-Odoi in a 2–1 final victory against Palmeiras. He scored his only goal of the season against Luton Town in a 3–2 FA Cup win on 2 March 2022. Saúl posted his goodbye to Chelsea and the club's fans on 7 June 2022 as his loan spell ended and he returned to Atlético Madrid.

International career

Saúl earned 47 caps for Spain, all youth levels comprised. He experienced individual and collective success in the under-19 team, winning the 2012 UEFA European Under-19 Championship and being named in the Team of the Tournament.

On 26 May 2015, Saúl was called to the senior team for a friendly with Costa Rica and a UEFA Euro 2016 qualifying match against Belarus, but did not make his debut on either occasion. He, Sergio Rico and Lucas Vázquez were the three uncapped players in a provisional squad for the final tournament in France, but was eventually cut from the final squad alongside Isco.

Saúl made his debut on 1 September 2016, playing 15 minutes in a 2–0 friendly win away to Belgium. He was crowned top scorer at the 2017 UEFA European Under-21 Championship, notably scoring a hat-trick to help Spain beat Italy 3–1 in the semi-final.

Back with the full team, Saúl was selected in the squad chosen by manager Julen Lopetegui for the 2018 FIFA World Cup in Russia. Following Fernando Hierro replacing the latter shortly before the tournament, he was an unused member in an eventual round-of-16 exit.

Under new coach Luis Enrique, Saúl scored his first goal for his country on 8 September 2018, equalising in an eventual 2–1 win against England for the 2018–19 UEFA Nations League A at Wembley Stadium. He also scored against Croatia in the following fixture three days later, a 6–0 victory in his hometown of Elche in the same competition.

Style of play
A midfielder by trade, Saúl was deployed as a centre-back during his spell at Rayo Vallecano. Spanish football journalist Guillem Balagué stated that he suits several styles of play, citing his ability to play "Simeone style" (in reference to Atlético manager Diego Simeone) and "Barcelona style", summing up with "We have never had a midfielder like this".

Following Luis Enrique's appointment as Spain manager in 2018, Diario AS Alfredo Relaño remarked that "Saúl is the player to move the ball forward with purpose and attempt to finalise long passages of possession", adding that "The new centre of the park for Spain (where so much happens for the national side) is now defined by him, a box-to-box player and one never afraid to try his luck in front of goal", Sid Lowe of The Guardian opined that "now he embodies the shift, technique and talent but athleticism too, blessed of impeccable timing, arriving in the area".

Personal life
Saúl comes from a football family: his father, Boria, played several years with Elche as a striker. His brothers, Aarón and Jony, are also footballers.

Saúl was one of the stars of the Amazon Prime television documentary series Six Dreams, recorded during the 2017–18 season. In June 2020, he announced that he and his brother Aarón would be starting a new youth project with Nike called Club Costa City, in his hometown.

Career statistics
Club

International

Spain score listed first, score column indicates score after each Saúl goal

HonoursAtlético MadridLa Liga: 2020–21
Supercopa de España: 2014
UEFA Europa League: 2017–18
UEFA Super Cup: 2018
UEFA Champions League runner-up: 2015–16ChelseaFIFA Club World Cup: 2021
FA Cup runner-up: 2021–22
EFL Cup runner-up: 2021–22Spain U17 
UEFA European Under-17 Championship runner-up: 2010Spain U19UEFA European Under-19 Championship: 2012Spain U21UEFA European Under-21 Championship runner-up: 2017Individual'
UEFA European Under-19 Championship Team of the Tournament: 2012
UEFA European Under-21 Championship Golden Boot: 2017
UEFA European Under-21 Championship Team of the Tournament: 2017
UEFA Europa League Squad of the Season: 2017–18

References

External links

Profile at the Atlético Madrid website
Profile at the Royal Spanish Football Federation website

1994 births
Living people
Footballers from Elche
Spanish footballers
Association football midfielders
Atlético Madrid B players
Atlético Madrid footballers
Rayo Vallecano players
Chelsea F.C. players
Segunda División B players
La Liga players
Premier League players
UEFA Europa League winning players
Spain youth international footballers
Spain under-21 international footballers
Spain international footballers
2018 FIFA World Cup players
Spanish expatriate footballers
Expatriate footballers in England
Spanish expatriate sportspeople in England